Flying Romeos is a 1928 American comedy adventure directed by Mervyn LeRoy and written by John McDermott, Sidney Lazarus, Gene Towne and John W. Conway. The film stars the comedy team of Charles Murray and George Sidney, stars of Universal's popular "The Cohens and Kellys" comedies, moonlighting at First National Pictures. Other sidekicks included Fritzi Ridgeway, Lester Bernard, Duke Martin, James Bradbury Jr. and Belle Mitchell. Flying Romeos was released on February 26, 1928, by First National Pictures, typically a B movie studio.

Plot
Barbers Cohen (George Sidney) and Cohan (Charles Murray) both love Minnie (Fritzi Ridgeway), their young manicurist, who has a fondness for aviators. Duly, the pair of hapless middle-aged lovers sign up for flying lessons and accidentally find themselves performing some wild stunts in an aircraft.

The owner of the "Spirit of Goldberg" (Lester Bernard) is impressed with the skills of these two tyros. He persuades the duo to make a long ocean flight. The flight leads to more aerial mayhem, especially when the "real" pilot (Duke Martin) turns out to be a lunatic. On their triumphant return, Cohen and Cohan sadly find their manicurist had married a pilot.

Cast   

 Charles Murray as Cohan
 George Sidney as Cohen
 Fritzi Ridgeway as Minnie
 Lester Bernard as Goldberg
 Duke Martin as The Aviator
 James Bradbury Jr. as The Nut
 Belle Mitchell as Mrs. Goldberg

Production
Aviation film historian Stephen Pendo, in Aviation in the Cinema (1985) characterized The Flying Romeos as an early "talkie" that was a comedy vehicle for two noted film comedians with a heavy reliance on slapstick aerial antics.

Reception
The contemporary film review of The Flying Romeos by Mordaunt Hall in The New York Times, noted, "The fun in this piece really starts when Messrs. Cohen and Cohan are tested for the air flights across the Pacific. ... The other truly laughable episode is where the friendly enemies are once more up in the air, the machine being steered by a man who happens to have spent the latter part of his life in a lunatic asylum."

Aviation film historian James M. Farmer in Celluloid Wings: The Impact of Movies on Aviation (1984), had a similar reaction, saying that Flying Romeos "... provides an excellent series of opportunities for some outrageous aerial thrills."

References

Notes

Citations

Bibliography

 Farmer, James H. Celluloid Wings: The Impact of Movies on Aviation (1st ed.). Blue Ridge Summit, Pennsylvania: TAB Books 1984. .
 Paris, Michael. From the Wright Brothers to Top gun: Aviation, Nationalism, and Popular Cinema. Manchester, UK: Manchester University Press, 1995. .
 Pendo, Stephen. Aviation in the Cinema. Lanham, Maryland: Scarecrow Press, 1985. .
 Wynne, H. Hugh. The Motion Picture Stunt Pilots and Hollywood's Classic Aviation Movies. Missoula, Montana: Pictorial Histories Publishing Co., 1987. .

External links
 
 
 

1928 films
American aviation films
1920s English-language films
American adventure comedy films
1920s adventure comedy films
First National Pictures films
Films directed by Mervyn LeRoy
American silent feature films
American black-and-white films
1928 comedy films
1920s American films
Silent American comedy films
Silent adventure comedy films